Khansar is a city in Isfahan province of Iran and the center of Khansar county. The history of Khansar dates back to pre-Islamic times. "Khan" meaning spring and "Sar" suffix indicate plurality. In the past, this name was given due to the abundance of springs in this region. Khansar people have an independent Khansari dialect that has its roots in the ancient Persian language and has been common in this region before Islam. According to the official census of 2016, the population of Khansar city was 21,883.

History 
There are documents about the migration of a group of Jews from the time of Cyrus the Great to Khansar and their history, which are currently kept in the city of Hamadan. These documents show the historical antiquity of Khansar. Immigrant Jews lived in the Jahuda (Jida) neighborhood and left the city before the 1978 Iranian revolution.
The history of this city goes back to pre-Islamic times, including the history of the existence of a fire temple called Tir, as well as a temple called Hikal located in Tir Mountain near the village of Tidjan and finally the tombstone that contains information in Pahlavi script and in Qudjan village has been found.
According to some records, the city dates back to Alexander's time. It is believed that Alexander passed through this place when he went to Isfahan and one of the battlefields of Alexander and Darius III in the region between Khansar, Kahrud and Isfahan was that Darius was defeated in this war.
During the Afghan invasion of Iran, Ashraf Afghan tried to capture the city with an army, but after facing resistance from the people, the siege was defeated and he withdrew.
After Islam, Khansar was in the realm of the Umayyads, the Abbasids, the Taherians, the Saffarids, the Dilmians, the Seljuks, and the Khwarezm Shahis. Early in the 7th century AH, the Mongols opened up the area, causing extensive damage. After that, Timur Lang invaded the center of Iran, including Khansar, and looted and killed many. During the Safavid period, Khansar was one of the important centers of science, literature and industry. Due to the special attention of Safavid kings to this city, handicrafts and workshops flourished in this city. Workshops such as oil painting, chit weaving, pottery, wool weaving, carpet weaving, spoon weaving, sewing and embroidery were also known. Tahmasb led to Khansar's cultural progress.
Among other incidents, the forced migration of a number of Khorasan Arabs by order of Nader Shah from Khorasan to a part of the city that is now known as Saudi Arabia, is now located east of Khansar. After the capture of Isfahan by the Afghans, Allahyordi Khan kept 10,000 IRGC troops in Khansar for nine months. During the Safavid era, during the Afghan invasion of Isfahan and then Khansar, the people of Khansar agreed with the Afghan army not to enter the city and in return to receive all the books and scientific copies that came with them in exchange for food. One of these valuable books was a linear Qur'an known as the Qur'an.
During the Qajar period, Khansar was considered, and some rulers with a ministry background were appointed to Khansar's government.

Population 
According to the 2006 census, the city's population was 20,490 people in 6,019 families. The majority of the population consists of Persians in national composition.

Name 
The word Khansar is written and pronounced in several ways, including Khavansar, Khanisar, Khoonsar, Khosar, Khansar and Khunsar. The word consists of two parts, the khan and the sar. khan means spring and pond, and the suffix sar indicates plurality.
Some believe that one day a camel driver came to this place with his camels and was caught by thieves and finally his blood was shed.
In other words, Khansar can mean the place of honey production.

Geography 

Khansari language 
Khansari is one of the Central Iranian languages and a branch of the Indo-Iranian languages. UNESCO has declared the language to be one of the most endangered languages due to the sharp decline in the number of speakers due to migration from the city.
The people of Khansar do not have a specific dialect, but they have an independent Khansari language, which has its roots in ancient Persian and has been common in this city since before Islam.

Transport 
The nearest airport is in the city of Aligudarz, 32 km west of Khansar.
Distance to Isfahan city (provincial capital) is about 150 km

Tourism

Natural tourism 
Khansar has many natural attractions, so it is known as a tourist attraction in the region and the province. This mountainous city is high and has a mountainous steppe with a variety of pebbles.

Golestankooh Laleh plain 
Golestan-Kooh is a region 15 km south of Khansar city with a latitude of 33.10 and a longitude of 5.024 and an altitude of 2750 meters. This pleasant climate plain has suitable summer conditions. The area is covered in spring with a variety of weeds and wild onions (shallots) and a variety of beautiful flowers, including tulips, lashes, inverted tulips, groves, fire tulips, mountain tulips. These flowers grow among the bushes and even on the rocks and have medicinal properties.

Khansar Garden Alleys 
The city of Khansar is a perfect example of a garden city in Iran. The trees grew in the shape of a green arch. Most of its water resources are in the form of springs. 450 current springs inside the city is one of the greenery factors of the city, which attracts tourists and nature lovers every year.

Sarcheshmeh Natural Park 
Sarcheshmeh Park is located as one of the typical tourist areas with an area of 15 hectares in the foothills of the Zagros Mountains in the south of the city. There are several water springs in the park as the main supplier of agricultural water to the city. The average number of tourists entering the park in the first six months of the year is close to 3,000 on normal days and over 12,000 during the holidays. The Sarcheshmeh Khansar tourism sample area was built in 2010 in coordination with the General Directorate of Cultural Heritage, Handicrafts and Tourism of Isfahan Province.

Gallery

Notable people from Khansar 
Adib Khansari, classical musician
Ali Shojaei, Iranian football player
Hacham Uriel Davidi, Jewish religious leader
Mohammad Javad Zarif Khonsari, Iranian Diplomat and Academic, Former Minister of Foreign Affairs (Iran)
Ali Akbar Mehrabian, Iranian politician, Ministry of Energy (Iran) 
Seyyed Ahmad Khansari, theologian, Marja'
Seyyed Mohammad Tagi Khansari, theologian, Marja'
Yadollah Kaboli Khansari, calligrapher
Mahmoud Mahmoudi Khansari, traditional singer
Ali Akbar Mehrabian, Minister of Energy, Former Minister of Industries and Mines

References

Populated places in Khansar County
Cities in Isfahan Province